Paul Consbruch (2 May 1930 – 2 February 2012) was a German Roman Catholic bishop.

Consbruch was born in Gütersloh, Germany. He was consecrated as Auxiliary Roman Catholic Bishop of Paderborn in 1981.

He died on 2 February 2012, as Auxiliary Bishop Emeritus of the Roman Catholic Diocese of Paderborn, from undisclosed causes, aged 81.

References

1930 births
2012 deaths
20th-century German Roman Catholic bishops
21st-century German Roman Catholic bishops
Roman Catholic bishops of Paderborn
20th-century German Roman Catholic priests
21st-century Roman Catholic bishops in Germany